The Festival de Beaune: Festival international d’opéra baroque is a month-long annual summer festival of baroque opera in Beaune, France. It is notable for revivals of many baroque operas and performances of Mozart on original instruments.

More recently the town has also become host, in a different week, to the Festival international du film policier de Beaune - a festival of detective films.

Founded in 1982, the Baroque Music Festival of Beaune has presented over 80 operas, over 30 of them significant revivals and world, European or French premières; over 100 oratorio and sacred music concerts, including 5 revivals or premières. In addition to recitals by individual performers. The festival also runs classes and voice workshops, the Académie de Chant baroque.

Venue 
The concerts take place in the Hospices de Beaune, 15th century, and in the Collégiale Notre-Dame de Beaune, 12th century, over four weekends in July.

Notable opera revivals 
The following includes only major revivals and premières:

1988
Marc-Antoine Charpentier: Actéon. dir. William Christie.
1990
George Frideric Handel: Flavio. dir. René Jacobs
1993
George Frideric Handel: Scipione. dir. Christophe Rousset
Campra: l’Europe Galante. Marc Minkowski
1994
George Frideric Handel: Poro. dir. Fabio Biondi
1995
George Frideric Handel: Riccardo Primo. Christophe Rousset
1994
Niccolò Jommelli: Armida abbandonata. Christophe Rousset
1995
Nicola Porpora: Arianna in Nasso. Rinaldo Alessandrini
1996 
Jean-Baptiste Lully: Acis et Galatée. Marc Minkowski
1997
Tommaso Traetta: Antigona. Christophe Rousset
Antonio de Literes: Los Elementos. Eduardo López Banzo

1998 
George Frideric Handel: Admeto. Christophe Rousset
Jean-Philippe Rameau: Zoroastre. William Christie
1999
Henri Desmarets: Didon. Christophe Rousset
Antonio de Literes: Acis y Galatea. Eduardo López Banzo
2001
Jean-Baptiste Lully: 'Persée. Christophe Rousset
Francesco Cavalli: I Strali d’Amore. Gabriel Garrido
2003
Giovanni Battista Pergolesi: L'Olimpiade. Ottavio Dantone
2004 
Giovanni Battista Pergolesi: Il Flaminio. Ottavio Dantone
2005 
Francesco Bartolomeo Conti: Don Quichotte in Sierra Morena. René Jacobs.

2008 
Domenico Scarlatti: Ottavia restituita al trono. Cappella della Pietà de Turchini, Antonio Florio.
Giovanni Battista Pergolesi: Adriano in Siria. Ottavio Dantone.
2009
No premieres - Handel celebration: Ariodante F. M. Sardelli; Giulio Cesare E. Lopez Banzo; Rinaldo O. Dantone; Acis and Galatea P. McCreesh.
2010 
Jean-Baptiste Lully: Bellérophon composed 1697, unperformed. Les Talens Lyriques, dir Christophe Rousset
2011 29th  Rameau  Dardanus 1744 , Porpora Semiramide riconosciuta (Porpora) Stefano Montanari,
2012 30th Vivaldi Orlando Furioso 1714, Septem verba a Christo René Jacobs
2013 31st Festival - L'incoronazione di Dario Dantone Amadis (Lully) Rousset Orlando Jacobs
2014 32nd - Handel Teseo and Serse, Rameau Zaïs and  Castor et Pollux
2015 33rd Nicola Porpora Il Trionfo della divina Giustizia Lully Armide  
2016 34th - Rameau  Zoroastre, Vivaldi   Tamerlano 
2017 35th Festival - Alessandro Scarlatti: Mitridate,  Handel Ottone, Lully Alceste
2018 36th Rodrigo (Handel) Giustino (Vivaldi)

References

External links
  
Classical music festivals in France

Music festivals in France
Early music festivals
Music festivals established in 1982
1982 establishments in France